The Indies Brigade or Indian Brigade (Dutch: Indische Brigade or Indiaansche Brigade), also referred to as the Dutch Indies Brigade or Netherlands Indies Brigade, was a short-lived Dutch-Belgian military unit which took part in the Waterloo Campaign and subsequent invasion of France in 1815. 

The brigade was composed of some 3,500 men recruited to garrison the Dutch colonies in the West Indies (Surinam and the Dutch Antilles) and East Indies (the Dutch East Indies, present-day Indonesia). The troops were a mix of Europeans and soldiers native to the colonies, although all officers were European.

The unit was under the command of Baron Lieutenant General Carl Heinrich Wilhelm Anthing, a German officer in Dutch service, and consisted of:
 the 5th East Indies Regiment of the Line (Oost-Indisch regiment No. 5) under G.M. Busman, consisting of two battalions 
 the 10th West Indies Battalion of light infantry (Bataljon West-Indische jagers No. 10) under H.W. Rancke 
 the 11th West Indies Battalion of light infantry  (Bataljon West-Indische jagers No. 11) under Frederik Knotzer
 a light battalion (Bataljon flankeurs) under Willem Schenck
 a battery of foot artillery with six 6-pound guns and two 5.5 inch howitzers 
 a baggage train

History 
After the formation of the United Kingdom of the Netherlands and the Anglo-Dutch Treaty of 1814, by which the British relinquished control of the Dutch colonies, King William I of the Netherlands acted to recruit troops to safeguard his colonial possessions. However, soon after, Napoleon escaped from exile on Elba and in June 1815 launched the Waterloo Campaign. The Dutch scrambled their troops to defend against the French invasion, and the troops bound for the colonies were combined into a temporary Indies Brigade and placed under Baron Lieutenant General Carl Heinrich Wilhelm Anthing, commander of the Dutch East Indies force.

During the Waterloo Campaign, the brigade formed part of II Corps under the British general Lord Hil. The unit was held in reserve and did not take part in either the Battle of Waterloo or the Battle of Quatre Bras. Allied commander-in-chief Arthur Wellesley, 1st Duke of Wellington positioned the brigade with the 1st Netherlands Division near the town of Halle. These Dutch-Belgian units, nominally under the command of then 18-year-old Prince Frederick of the Netherlands, were joined on the morning of 18 June by British and Hanoverian units. The troops, 17,000 in all, were placed around Halle to protect the Allied right (Western) flank from French attack, and instructed to hold their ground if attacked. However, they remained in reserve and did not take part in the fighting.

In the Allied invasion of France following the victory at Waterloo, the Indies Brigade took part in the assaults on Le Quesnoy, Valenciennes and Condé-sur-l'Escaut. The unit's commander, General Anthing, negotiated the French surrender of Le Quesnoy.

On the 15th of August, the brigade departed France for the Netherlands. Upon return, the unit was disbanded on the 6th of September so that the troops could made preparations to leave for the colonies. On the 29th of October the first of the troops from the Indies Brigade left the Netherlands, sailing for the Dutch East Indies from Texel.

References

External links 
 "The Dutch Indian Brigade", The Napoleon Series

Brigades of the Netherlands
Military history of the Netherlands
Military units and formations of the Napoleonic Wars
Military units and formations established in 1815
Military units and formations disestablished in 1815
United Kingdom of the Netherlands
Dutch Empire